Iliturgi Club de Fútbol was a Spanish football team based in Andújar, Jaén, in the autonomous community of Andalusia. Founded in 1974 and dissolved in 1994, they played in the Tercera División for 13 seasons, and held home matches at Campo Municipal de Fútbol Santa Úrsula, with a capacity of 1,000 people.

History
Founded in 1974 as a replacement to dissolved CD Iliturgi, Iliturgi CF first reached the Tercera División in 1977, playing in the category for two seasons before suffering relegation in 1979. They returned to the fourth tier at first attempt, and played for six consecutive seasons in the division four before dropping a level in 1986.

Iliturgi returned to the fourth division in 1987, but suffered immediate relegation. After two seasons in the Regional Preferente, the club returned to Tercera in 1990, but suffered relegation in 1994 after finishing in the last position of their group. Shortly after, the club was dissolved, and CD Iliturgi returned to an active status.

Season to season

13 seasons in Tercera División

References

Defunct football clubs in Andalusia
Association football clubs established in 1974
Association football clubs disestablished in 1994
1974 establishments in Spain
1994 disestablishments in Spain